Guadalupe Martínez Guzmán (born 5 April 1992) is a Mexican professional boxer who held the WBC female super flyweight title from 2017 to December 2020. Between 2013 and 2014, she challenged for the IBF female super flyweight and junior flyweight titles, as well as the WBA interim female super flyweight title twice. As of September 2020, she is ranked as the world's best active female super flyweight by The Ring and BoxRec.

Professional career
Guzmán made her professional debut on 7 July 2012, scoring a four-round unanimous decision (UD) over Maria Munos at the Palenque de la Feria in Chilpancingo, Mexico. All three judges scored the bout 39–37.

After compiling a record of 4–2 (3 KOs), she faced Daniela Romina Bermúdez (12–2–2, 2 KOs) for the WBA interim female super flyweight title on 12 April 2013, at the Centro Cosmopolita Unión y Progreso in Roldán, Argentina. Guzmán suffered the third defeat of her career by UD (100–91.5, 100–91, 100–90.5). Her next fight was against Ana Arrazola (17–9–2, 13 KOs) for the vacant WBF female light flyweight title against on 17 August at the Hotel Paraiso Caxcan in Apozol, Mexico. Guzmán again lost by UD with all three judges scoring the bout 100–90. 

After winning her next two fights, both by UD, she faced undefeated IBF female super flyweight champion Débora Dionicius (14–0, 4 KOs) on 20 December at the Club Social y Cultural El Cruce in Malvinas Argentinas, Argentina. Guzmán lost by UD with all three judges scoring the bout 100–90. For her next fight she moved down in weight to challenge IBF female junior flyweight champion Naoko Shibata (11–3, 3 KOs) on 3 March 2014 at the Korakuen Hall in Tokyo, Japan. Guzmán lost in her fourth world title attempt by UD with the scorecards reading 98–92, 98–93 and 99–91. She won her next fight by split decision (SD) before making a second attempt at the WBA interim female super flyweight title, this time against Linda Laura Lecca on 30 August at the Complejo Deportivo "El Cancherín" in Huarochirí, Peru. Guzmán lost by UD with all three judges scoring the bout 100–90.

Her next fight was against Ava Knight (12–2–3, 5 KOs) for the WBC International female flyweight title. The fight took place on 13 November at Washington Hilton & Towers in Washington, D.C., Guzmán again lost by UD, with all three judges scoring the bout 100–90. After a UD win the following month, she captured the WBC Silver female super flyweight title against Judith Rodriguez (8–7, 5 KOs) on 24 April 2015 at Foro Polanco in Mexico City, Mexico. Two judges scored the bout 99–91 and the third scored it 98–92. After securing three more wins, defending her WBC Silver title once, she lost a fifth-round technical decision (TD) to Jasseth Noriega (17–4–2, 5 KOs) in October 2016.

Guzmán bounced back with two UD wins before facing WBC female super flyweight champion Zulina Muñoz (48–1–2, 28 KOs) on 13 May 2017 at the Grand Oasis Arena in Cancún, Mexico. In what was described as a "huge upset", Guzmán defeated the long-reigning champion via UD, with two judges scoring the bout 96–93 and the third scoring it 95–94.

Professional boxing record

References

External links

Living people
1992 births
Mexican women boxers
Light-flyweight boxers
Flyweight boxers
Super-flyweight boxers
World Boxing Council champions
Boxers from the State of Mexico
People from Tlalnepantla de Baz